Alexandru Britov (born 1964) is a Soviet rower. He competed in the men's eight event at the 1992 Summer Olympics.

References

External links
 
 

1964 births
Living people
Soviet male rowers
Olympic rowers of the Unified Team
Rowers at the 1992 Summer Olympics
Place of birth missing (living people)